Uttarakhand flood may refer to:

2013 North India floods
2021 Uttarakhand flood